Los Lunas is a village in Valencia County, New Mexico, United States. As of the 2010 census, the village population is 14,835 inside the village limits due to the new housing developments at El Cerro de Los Lunas (Huning Ranch). It is the county seat of Valencia County. Los Lunas is part of the Albuquerque Metropolitan Statistical Area. The name "Los Lunas" is a partial Anglicization of the name of the Luna family, who originally settled in the area (los Luna, in Spanish).

History 
The original land grant was made to Don Adrian Luna Candelaria in 1716, but within two years it was given to the Luna family. Some Civil War battles were fought near the village. Los Lunas became the county seat in 1876 and became an incorporated village in 1928. The Los Lunas Decalogue Stone is located nearby.

Geography and climate
Los Lunas is located at  (34.809336, −106.735247). According to the United States Census Bureau, the village has a total area of 10.1 square miles (26.0 km), all land. The village lies in the Rio Grande Valley of the Albuquerque Basin on the west bank of the Rio Grande, and is on State Highway 6, east of Interstate 25. El Cerro de Los Lunas, a volcano related to the Rio Grande rift, forms a prominent landmark at the western edge of the village.

Demographics

2010
Whereas according to the 2010 U.S. Census Bureau:

72.1% White
2.0% Black
2.5% Native American
0.8% Asian 
0.1% Native Hawaiian or Pacific Islander 
4.2% Two or more races
18.3% Other races

2000
As of the census of 2000, there were 10,034 people, 3,601 households, and 2,689 families residing in the village. The population density was 998.8 people per square mile (385.5/km). There were 3,845 housing units at an average density of 382.7 per square mile (147.7/km). The racial makeup of the village was 64.14% White, 1.16% African American, 2.62% Native American, 0.50% Asian, 0.06% Pacific Islander, 27.63% from other races, and 3.90% from two or more races. Hispanic or Latino of any race were 58.74% of the population.

There were 3,601 households, out of which 41.9% had children under the age of 18 living with them, 51.8% were married couples living together, 16.8% had a female householder with no husband present, and 25.3% were non-families. 20.7% of all households were made up of individuals, and 5.8% had someone living alone who was 65 years of age or older. The average household size was 2.75 and the average family size was 3.16.

In the village, the population was spread out, with 31.1% under the age of 18, 9.6% from 18 to 24, 30.1% from 25 to 44, 20.2% from 45 to 64, and 8.9% who were 65 years of age or older. The median age was 32 years. For every 100 females, there were 95.0 males. For every 100 females age 18 and over, there were 90.1 males.

The median income for a household in the village was $36,240, and the median income for a family was $37,255. Males had a median income of $30,664 versus $22,437 for females. The per capita income for the village was $14,692. About 11.6% of families and 13.5% of the population were below the poverty line, including 18.3% of those under age 18 and 7.3% of those age 65 or over.

Growth was rapid for Los Lunas in the 1990s and early 2000s, with the enrollment of Los Lunas High School reaching nearly 2,500 students around 2004. In fact, Valencia High School opened in 2006 as a relief valve for that enrollment, but due in part to the recession of the late 2000s, the two schools had a similar enrollment by the end of the decade.

The town has been the site of two episodes of Breaking Bad.

Military
A United States Army Air Forces bombing range, used by elements of the 509th Bomb Wing out of Kirtland Army Air Field, later Kirtland Air Force Base, was located here during and after World War II.

Education
Los Lunas' public schools are operated by Los Lunas Public Schools, which includes three high schools, two middle schools, one intermediate school, and ten elementary schools. Another school entitled Family School is a program that allows the combination of public school and homeschooling, found on the Daniel Fernandez Elementary Campus.

Notable people

 Rosie Hamlin, Hit singer of the song Angel Baby
 Sal Artiaga, Minor League Baseball president, born in Los Lunas
 Bo Diddley, rock musician, lived in Los Lunas in the 1970s
 Anton Docher (aka The Padre of Isleta) served as a priest in Los Lunas during his long period in Isleta
 Michael A. Montoya, 26th New Mexico State Treasurer
 Adelina Otero-Warren, women's suffragist
 Walter Jon Williams, Nebula Award-winning science fiction author

Events
The village offers a variety of events to go to. Among them are annual events such as: the St. Patrick's Day Balloon Rally; Fourth of July Parade, celebration and fireworks display at Daniel Fernandez Park; and the Holiday Electric Light Parade down Main Street (NM Highway 6).

Facebook data center

On September 14, 2016, Facebook announced their plans to open a data center in Los Lunas. The construction would start in October 2016, and it will be equipped with the latest in the Open Compute Project hardware designs, protected from the frequent dust storms that occur in New Mexico, and powered by 100% clean and renewable energy through solar and wind plants. This data center will support 300 new construction jobs and 50 permanent jobs.

References

External links

 Village of Los Lunas

Albuquerque metropolitan area
County seats in New Mexico
Villages in New Mexico
Villages in Valencia County, New Mexico